Utricularia vitellina is a small or very small, probably perennial carnivorous plant that belongs to the genus Utricularia. It was originally described by Henry Nicholas Ridley in 1923. It is distinct from the rest of the species in section Oligocista by not having a basal swelling of the lower corolla lip.

See also 
 List of Utricularia species

References 

vitellina
Endemic flora of Peninsular Malaysia
Carnivorous plants of Asia